D'Aguilar Peak or Hok Tsui Shan is a hill in southeastern Hong Kong. D'Aguilar Peak is clearly visible from the Dragon's Back trail, although the trail doesn't traverse its summit. It is named after Major-General Sir George Charles d'Aguilar.

Geography

D'Aguilar Peak is 325m in height. To the north lies another hill called Shek O Peak.

Conservation

Access
It is possible to access the summit of D'Aguilar Peak after hiking for about 30 minutes from Cape D'Aguilar Road. There is also a steep and rocky trail from Shek O Beach that leads to the summit.

See also
 List of mountains, peaks and hills in Hong Kong
 Dragon's Back
 Cape D'Aguilar

References

External links

 Hong Kong Trail No. 8

Southern District, Hong Kong